Sven Kramer (born 23 April 1986) is a retired Dutch long track speed skater who has won an all time record nine World Allround Championships as well as a record ten European Allround Championships. He is the Olympic champion of the 5000 meters at the Vancouver 2010, Sochi 2014 and Pyeongchang 2018 Olympics, and won a record 21 gold medals at the World Single Distance Championships; eight in the 5000 meters, five in the 10,000 meters, and eight in the team pursuit. Kramer is the current world record holder in the team pursuit (alongside Douwe de Vries and Marcel Bosker) and broke the world records in the 5000 meter and 10,000 meter events three times. By winning the 2010 World Allround Championship, Kramer became the first speed skater in history to win four consecutive world allround championships and eight consecutive international allround championships. He was undefeated in the 18 international allround championships he participated in from the 2006/2007 season until the 2016/2017 season. From November 2007 to March 2009, he was ranked first in the Adelskalender, but despite his dominance as an all-round skater he has since been overtaken on that list by Shani Davis and, more recently, by his teammate Patrick Roest.

On 27 March 2020, it was announced that Kramer extended his contract with the Jumbo-Visma speed skating team until the 2022 Winter Olympics.

On 28 October 2021 it was announced that Sven was going to retire in 2022.

Personal life
Sven Kramer was born on 23 April 1986 in Heerenveen, Friesland, Netherlands. He is the son of former speed skater Yep Kramer, and the four-year-older brother of speed skater Brecht Kramer. He is a born Frisian.

Since 2007 he has been in a long-term relationship with Dutch field hockey player Naomi van As, and they welcomed a daughter in October 2018.

On 3 March 2010, Kramer was awarded as Knight of the Order of the Netherlands Lion for his services to sport, i.e., winning the Men's 5000 m speed skating competition at the  010 Winter Olympics in Vancouver. On 12 March 2022, he was further appointed as Officer of the Order of Orange-Nassau for his exceptional performance in sport over the years.

Speed skating career

Junior career
In the 2004 season, he came in second at the Junior allround world championships.

In December 2004, he won the Dutch Allround Championships at just 18 years old and thus qualified for the European Allround Championships for the first time, where he won the silver medal. He came third at the World Allround Championships 2005. At the end of that season, he signed a contract with the Dutch TVM-team.

Kramer set a new world record for the 5000 m in Salt Lake City on 19 November 2005, when he was 19 years old. With his time of 6:08.78, he also entered the top 10 of the all-time world ranking, the Adelskalender. That season he became the Junior allround world champion.

Kramer stopped skating in the junior competition and became a senior speed skater when he was 20 years old.

Season 2005–2006
On 11 February 2006, he won the silver medal in the 5000 m at the 2006 Winter Olympic in Turin. Kramer also participated in the team pursuit event. The Dutch team was the favourite and was leading Italy by nearly a full second in their semi-final, but Kramer stepped on a block and fell, taking Carl Verheijen with him. In the race for bronze, they defeated Norway, giving Kramer his second medal of the Games.

Kramer also competed in two other distances, the 1500 and the 10,000 meter. Due to a screw in his skate that broke just a few minutes before his race, Kramer came in 15th at the 1500. The 10,000 meters did not go as planned, and he finished in 7th. Afterward, Kramer stepped on the concrete with his skates in his frustration, damaging the blades.

During the 2006 European Allround Championships in Hamar, Kramer reached fourth place after a tournament full of incidents. The ice began to melt on the first day, and the skaters had to wait until later in the evening to continue skating.

During the 2006 World Allround Championships in Calgary, Kramer set a new world record in the 10,000 meter event with a time of 12:51.60. Kramer won both the two longest distances of the tournament, but had to settle for bronze overall.

Season 2006–2007
In the 2006–2007 season, Kramer won the first two 5000 m World Cup races, the second in 6:09.78, just outside his world record time. In December 2006, he again became national allround champion, where a personal record in the 500 meter event, his weakest distance, gave him great prospects for the international allround championships.

On 14 January 2007, Kramer was crowned European Allround Champion in Collalbo, Italy. There had been a tight battle between Kramer and the 2006 winner Enrico Fabris. Fabris won the two shorter and Kramer the two longer distances, but his overall score was lower than Fabris' (148.800 to 149.389). In addition, his times in the 5 and 10 km were new world records for outdoor skating. By skating a new personal best in the 1500 m, Kramer overtook fellow Dutchman Jochem Uytdehaage and Enrico Fabris on the Adelskalender. On the Adelskalender, he was ranked first as of 17 November 2007.

On 11 February 2007, Kramer became World Allround Champion for the first time. He skated the 500 m and the 10 km in personal bests, the latter in a new world record of 12:49.88.

At the World Championships of 2007 in Salt Lake City, Kramer participated in the 5000, 10,000 meters, and the team pursuit. He won three out of three, the 10,000 m and the team pursuit in world records.

Kramer became Skater of the year. The female skater of the year was Ireen Wüst.

Season 2007–2008
In the first season competition, Fabris beat Kramer in the 5000 meter, where he set a new world record, 6:07.40. A week later, Kramer got his world record back with a time of 6:03.32.

In Kolomna, Russia, Kramer won the European Allround Championship for the second time.

On 10 February, Kramer became World Allround Champion in Berlin, Germany, for the second time.

During the Essent ISU World Cup in Hamar (Norway), Kramer was awarded the Oscar Mathisen Award mainly due to the four world records he skated during 2007. Kramer skated four distances: 1500, 5000, 10,000 meters, and the team pursuit. In the 1500 meter event, Kramer skated a good race and placed second, ahead of Olympic Champion Enrico Fabris and Shani Davis. Denny Morrison from Canada won the race. Kramer won three gold medals in the 5000 and 10,000 m distances and the team pursuit, just like the year before.

Kramer became Skater of the year for the second time in a row. The female skater of the year was Paulien van Deutekom.

Season 2008–2009
At the national single distance championships in Heerenveen, Kramer won the 1500, 5000, and the 10,000 meters; by winning these three distances, he brought his national titles total up to 11.

He won gold at the national allround championships in Heerenveen and at the European allround championships in Heerenveen. At the world single distance championships in Vancouver, Kramer won gold in the 5000, 10,000 meters, and the team pursuit.

Kramer won gold at the world allround championships in Hamar.

For the third time, he was chosen as "skater of the year" in the Netherlands and received the Ard Schenk Award.

Season 2009–2010

At the national championships for single distances in Heerenveen, Kramer won the 5000 and the 10,000 meters. He failed to qualify for the World Cup for the 1500 meters.

Kramer won gold at the European allround championships in Hamar in January 2010. He became the allround European champion for the fourth year in a row. He won the final 10,000 meter race from the Italian Enrico Fabris, who ended second in the overall rankings. Russian Ivan Skobrev finished third.

At the 2010 Winter Olympics, Kramer was the favourite to win three gold medals, like his countryman Ard Schenk at the 1972 Olympics in Sapporo. At the 5000 meters race of the 2010 Winter Olympics in Vancouver, Kramer grabbed the gold medal with a new Olympic record of 6:14.60, beating the previous time of Jochem Uytdehaage by 0.06 seconds. He finished ahead of South Korean Lee Seung-hoon and Russian Ivan Skobrev, leaving four Olympic champions, Shani Davis, Enrico Fabris, Chad Hedrick and Bob de Jong, empty-handed.

Shortly after his 5000 meter victory, an NBC-affiliated reporter asked Kramer to say his name, country, and what he'd just won, to which Kramer replied, "Are you stupid? Hell no, I'm not gonna do that."

In the 10,000 meter event, Kramer finished first, with a time of 12:54.50, only to be disqualified for incorrectly changing lanes during one of the later laps. As a result, Lee Seung-hoon won gold with a new Olympic record, 12:58.55. The lane change mistake was caused by incorrect directions shouted to Kramer by his coach, Gerard Kemkers, near the end of the race.

Kramer didn't participate at the Dutch national championships since he needed rest after the Olympic games in Vancouver and to recover for the World Allround Championships in Heerenveen on 19–21 March.

At the World allround championships in Heerenveen on 19–21 March 2010, Kramer won an unprecedented fourth consecutive title. In the general classification after three distances, he ranked number 2, but in the final 10K race he skated 12:57.97 which was more than enough to pass Jonathan Kuck who was leading the overall classification before the start. Kuck ended number 2, Håvard Bøkko third. It was Kramer's 8th consecutive championship title in the European and World allround championships, another unprecedented feat.

Kramer became Skater of the year for the fourth time in a row. The female skater of the year was Ireen Wüst.

Season 2010–2011
Kramer did not participate in this season because of an injury to one of the nerves (neuropathy) in his leg.

Season 2011–2012
In the 2011–2012 season, Kramer returned to professional speed skating. He completed the European allround championships in Budapest in first place, claiming his fifth European allround championship.

At the world allround championships in Moscow, he also finished in first place, claiming his fifth championship. This tied the record shared by Oscar Mathisen, who won his 5th title in 1914, and Clas Thunberg, who won his 5th title in 1931.

Season 2012–2013
Kramer won the European allround championships in Heerenveen in January for a record sixth time, tying the record of Rintje Ritsma.

Kramer also won the World Allround Championships in Hamar in February for a record sixth time.

Season 2013–2014

In preparation for the Winter Olympics, Kramer chose not to compete in the European allround championships.

At the 2014 Winter Olympics, Kramer won gold at the 5000 m with an Olympic record of 6:10.76. Kramer also won silver in the 10,000 m. He withdrew from the 1500 m.

Season 2014–2015

At the 2015 European allround championships in Chelyabinsk, Kramer won his 7th title.

Season 2015–2016
At the 2016 European allround championships in Minsk, Kramer won a record 8th title.

Season 2017–2018
At the 2018 Winter Olympics in Pyeongchang, South Korea, Kramer won the gold medal in the 5000 meter event, breaking his own Olympic record from 2014 with a time of 6:09.76. This was his third gold medal in a row in this event, and he became the only male speed skater to win the same Olympic event three times. He also became the first man to win eight Olympic medals in speed skating. In the 10,000 m event he finished sixth. In the following World championship allround he placed fourth overall.

Records

Personal records

Source:

He is currently in 3rd position in the adelskalender.

World records

Olympic records

Source:Vancouver 2010

Tournament overview
Source:

 DNF = Did not finish
 DQ = Disqualified
 WDR = Withdrew
 NC = No classification

World Cup overview

Source:
 – = did not participate
 * = 10000m
 (b) = Division B

Medals won

See also
List of multiple Olympic gold medalists

References

External links

Sven Kramer, profile on the official team website 

1986 births
Dutch male speed skaters
Speed skaters at the 2006 Winter Olympics
Speed skaters at the 2010 Winter Olympics
Speed skaters at the 2014 Winter Olympics
Speed skaters at the 2018 Winter Olympics
Speed skaters at the 2022 Winter Olympics
Olympic speed skaters of the Netherlands
Medalists at the 2006 Winter Olympics
Medalists at the 2010 Winter Olympics
Medalists at the 2014 Winter Olympics
Medalists at the 2018 Winter Olympics
Olympic medalists in speed skating
Olympic gold medalists for the Netherlands
Olympic silver medalists for the Netherlands
Olympic bronze medalists for the Netherlands
Sportspeople from Heerenveen
Living people
World Allround Speed Skating Championships medalists
World Single Distances Speed Skating Championships medalists